The 15th Military Division also known as the 15th Military Region was an infantry formation of division-size of the Armistice Army that was active during World War II. The division's headquarters was in Marseille. This division was subordinated to the 1st Group of Military Divisions.

History 
The 15th Military Division was formed on 12 September 1940. On 8 November 1942 at 15:00, just before Case Anton, the 15th Military Division positioned themselves for battle.

Commanders 

 General de corps d'armée (equivalent to Lieutenant-General) Henri-Fernand Dentz (27 June to 28 December 1940)
 MG 
 MG  or MG

Composition 

The 15th Military Division's Order of Battle was such:

 43rd Alpine Infantry Regiment:
HQ (at Fréjus)
1st Bn. (at Fréjus)
2nd Bn. (at Fréjus)
3rd Bn. (at Arles)
 :
HQ (at Marseille)
1st Bn. (at Marseille)
2nd Bn. (at Marseille)
3rd Bn. (at Tarascon)
  (in Bastia, Corsica)
 2nd Chasseurs Alpins Demi-brigade (HQ at Hyères)
 (at Digne)
 (at Hyères)
 (at Hyères)
 12th Cuirassier Regiment (in Orange):
1 cavalry bn - 2 sqns
1 bicycle bn - 2 cos
1 mixed bn - 1 bicycle co & 1 armored car co.
 :
HQ (at Nîmes)
1st Bn. (each battalion had 3 75mm btrys) (at Nîmes)
2nd Bn. (each battalion had 3 75mm btrys) (at Marseille)
3rd Bn. (1 mot 75mm btry & 2 Mountain 75mm btrys) (at Draguignan)
 7th Engineer Battalion (at Avignon) 
 8/15th Signals Group (at Avignon)
 15th Transportation Group (at Marseille)
2nd Garde Regiment - HQ at Marseille
 1er Bataillon
 HQ - Marseille
 1er Escadron - Cavalry/Reconnaissance
 2e Escadron - Cavalry/Reconnaissance
 3e Escadron - Infantry
 4e Escadron - Motorcycle
 2e Bataillon
 HQ - Nice
 5e Escadron - Motorcycle
 6e Escadron - Infantry
 7e Escadron - Infantry
 8e Escadron - Infantry

Military Commands 
The following Departemental Military Commands were under the 15th Military Division:

 Bouches-du-Rhône (at Marseille)
 Gard (at Nîmes)
 Ardèche (at Privas)
 Vaucluse (at Avignon)
 Var (at Toulon)
 Basses Alpes (at Digne)
 Alpes Maritimes (at Nice)
  (at Bastia)
Numerous Military District Commands of these places were subordinated to the 15th Military Division:

 Aix
 Draguignan
 Grasse
 Ajaccio
 Corte
 Sartène

Training grounds 

References

Notes

Footnotes

Sources 

 

Military units and formations disestablished in 1942
Military units and formations established in 1940
Divisions of Vichy France